Charles Tolliver (born 1942) is an American jazz trumpeter, composer, and co-founder of Strata East Records.

Biography
Tolliver was born in Jacksonville, Florida, in 1942 and moved with his family to New York City when he was 10. During his childhood, his grandmother gave him his first horn, a cornet he had coveted. Tolliver attended Howard University in the early 1960s as a pharmacy major, when he decided to pursue music as a career and return home to New York City. He came to prominence in 1964, playing and recording on Jackie McLean's Blue Note albums. In 1971, Tolliver and Stanley Cowell founded Strata-East Records, and Tolliver released many albums and collaborations on Strata-East. Following a long hiatus, he reemerged in the late 2000s, releasing two albums arranged for big band, With Love and Emperor March. With Love was nominated in 2007 for a Grammy award for Best Large Jazz Ensemble.

He would later describe his experience: "There was so much going on with the music. Like with bebop, we had a long period of just salivating on. There were all these different idioms within a genre, the avant-garde and free music, bebop still, and of course the music of John Coltrane and Miles. It was just a hell of a period. And then there was also the political scene going on...."

Discography

As leader
 1965: "Brilliant Corners" on The New Wave in Jazz (Impulse!)
 1968: Paper Man (Freedom), also released as Charles Tolliver and His All Stars (Black Lion)
 1970: The Ringer (Polydor)
 1970: Live at Slugs' (Strata-East)
 1971: Music Inc. (Strata-East)
 1972: Impact (Enja)
 1972: Live at the Loosdrecht Jazz Festival (Strata-East), also released as Grand Max (Black Lion)
 1974/1975: Live in Tokyo (Strata-East)
 1975: Impact (Strata-East)
 1977: Compassion (Strata-East), also released as New Tolliver (Baystate)
 1988: Live in Berlin at the Quasimodo Vol. 1 (Strata-East)
 1988: Live in Berlin at the Quasimodo Vol. 2 (Strata-East)
 2007: With Love (Blue Note)
 2009: Emperor March: Live at the Blue Note (Half Note)
 2020: Connect (Gearbox Records)

As a sideman
With Roy Ayers
Virgo Vibes (Atlantic, 1967)
Stoned Soul Picnic (Atlantic, 1968)
With Gary Bartz
Another Earth (Milestone, 1969)
With Booker Ervin
Structurally Sound (Pacific Jazz, 1966)
Booker 'n' Brass (Pacific Jazz, 1967)
With Louis Hayes
Light and Lively (SteepleChase, 1989)
The Crawl (Candid, 1989)
Una Max (SteepleChase, 1989)
With Andrew Hill
One for One (Blue Note, 1965, 1969, 1970 [1975])
Dance with Death (Blue Note, 1968 [1980])
Time Lines (Blue Note, 2006)
With Jackie McLean
It's Time! (Blue Note, 1964)
Action Action Action (Blue Note, 1964)
Jacknife (Blue Note, 1965)
With Oliver Nelson
Swiss Suite (Flying Dutchman, 1971)
With Max Roach
Members, Don't Git Weary (Atlantic, 1968)
With Horace Silver
Serenade to a Soul Sister (Blue Note, 1968)
With McCoy Tyner
Song for My Lady (Milestone, 1972)
With Gerald Wilson
Live and Swinging (Pacific Jazz, 1967)

References

External links 

1942 births
Living people
musicians from Jacksonville, Florida
American jazz composers
American male jazz composers
American jazz trumpeters
American male trumpeters
Howard University alumni
Strata-East Records artists
Enja Records artists
Freedom Records artists
21st-century trumpeters
21st-century American male musicians
Black Lion Records artists